Chelsea Township is a township in Butler County, Kansas, USA.  As of the 2000 census, its population was 190.

History
Chelsea Township was organized in 1876. The township was named by a settler from Boston after Chelsea, Massachusetts. Some sources give it as the birthplace of painter Gladys Nelson Smith.

Geography
According to the USGS, it contains one cemetery, Chelsea.

The streams of Cole Creek, Durechen Creek and Gilmore Branch run through this township.

Further reading

References

 USGS Geographic Names Information System (GNIS)

External links
 City-Data.com

Townships in Butler County, Kansas
Townships in Kansas
Populated places established in 1876
1876 establishments in Kansas